Little Five Fest was amusic festival in Atlanta, Ga. The event partnered with several local venues and featured 50 or so local bands as an annual showcase of the Music of Atlanta.  The event started in 2004 as "Othersound Music Festival" and evolved over the years to take on a more general tone representing the entire area of Little 5 Points and as an alternative to the mainstream music festival Music Midtown.  The festival focused on local and independent music groups: "Focusing on bands just under the indie mainstream radar, the Other Sound Music Festival has a rich history of booking the right bands.".  The festival usually features bands from local label mainstays like Rob's House Records, Die Slaughterhaus Records and ISP-Music (Industrial Strength Promotions) among others.  While previous festivals focused heavily on rock music, the festival featured a variety of musical genres including Rap, Hip-hop, Country, Electronic Music, DJ sets, performance art and theater.

Past lineups (partial list)

2009 (partial list) 

Star Bar Stage: The Selmanaires, Book Of Colors, A Fight To The Death, Grand Prize Winners From Last Year, Club Awesome, Falcon Lords, Distile Records - United States "Unsilvered Mirrors", Author's Apology, Los Buenos
Criminal Records stage: Jeffrey Butzer, The Orphins, Yo La Tengo, This Piano Plays itself

2010 (Lineup by venue)

2011 (partial lineup)

Aku You
Anna Kramer and the Lost Cause
Baby Baby
Back Pockets
Cousin Dan
Darling Norman
DJ Homo
G.G. King
Ghost Bikini
Glen Iris (Members included Justin Hughes of Rock*A*Teens fame and Chris Strawn)
Grand Prize Winners from Last Year
Gun Party
Hawkeye Pierce
Hip to Death
I Want Whisky
Jack of Hearts
Jack Preston and the Dojo Collective
Jade Lemons and the Crimson Lust
Jeffrey Bützer
King Congregation
Lille
Lucy Dreams
Mermaids
Order of the Owl
Ralph
Skin Jobs
Shepherds
Street Violence
The Head
This Piano Plays Itself
Tornado Town
West End Motel (Members included Brent Hinds of Mastodon and Tom Cheshire)
What Happened to Your Fire, Tiger?
Young Antiques
Young Orchids

In 2012 the venues were hosted at Criminal Records music and comic book shop, Aurora Coffee and three stages at the Star Bar.

2012 

According to Creative Loafing (Atlanta), the 2012 festival was scheduled to take place on September 29, 2012, will feature over 90 bands and is spread across 9 venues.

Sponsors and supporters

While the festival is usually sponsored mostly by local record labels and businesses, there have been a number of nationally known sponsors such as Pabst Blue Ribbon (produced by the Pabst Brewing Company), the High Museum of Art, Creative Loafing, Zipcar, Orange Amplification, Scoutmob and Whynatte Latte.

References

Musical subcultures
Music festivals in Atlanta
Counterculture communities
History of Atlanta
American music history
Underground culture